Helicobacter cellulitis is a cutaneous condition caused by Helicobacter cinaedi. H. cinaedi can cause cellulitis and bacteremia in immunocompromised people.

See also 
 Cellulitis
 Skin lesion

References 

Bacterium-related cutaneous conditions